"Boyfriend" is a song by American singer Selena Gomez, included on the deluxe edition of her third studio album Rare (2020). The song was released as the album’s fourth and final single overall on April 9, 2020.

Background
Gomez wrote "Boyfriend" after having a text message conversation with co-writer Julia Michaels. "I want a boyfriend" was the original title of the song. Gomez first revealed the song in an interview on The Tonight Show Starring Jimmy Fallon on January 14, 2020, where she said it was an unreleased song from Rare. She later announced the song would appear on the deluxe edition of Rare on April 6, 2020. The next day she teased the song's lyrics "There's a difference between a want and a need. Some nights I just want more than me" on social media. She wrote about the song's background saying:
Many of you know how excited I have been to release a song called 'Boyfriend.' It's a lighthearted song about falling down and getting back up time and time again in love, but also knowing that you don't need anyone other than yourself to be happy. We wrote it long before our current crisis, but in the context of today, I want to be clear that a boyfriend is nowhere near the top of my list of priorities. Just like the rest of the world, I'm praying for safety, unity and recovery during this pandemic.

Composition
The song features a house beat and an electropop pre-chorus. In terms of music notation, "Boyfriend" was composed using  common time, with a tempo of 92 beats per minute. Gomez's vocal range spans from the low note of G3 to the high note of E5.

Music videos
The official music video premiered on YouTube on April 10, 2020. It features Gomez meeting boys in choosing who will be her new lover, but she realizes the boys are not sincere. Hence, Gomez uses magic perfume that transforms the boys into frogs and then puts them into a small cage and takes the boys who are turned into frogs with her to the car. It was directed by Matty Peacock. The video was nominated for Best Art Direction at the 2020 MTV Video Music Awards. Billboard named it one of the best music videos of 2020.

Doll version
A doll music video for the song, directed by a fan, was released on April 29, 2020.

Credits and personnel
Credits adapted from Tidal.

 Selena Gomez – vocals, songwriting
 The Roommates – production, vocal production, percussion
 Julia Michaels – songwriting, backing vocals
 Justin Tranter – songwriting
 Jon Wienner – songwriting, recording, studio personnel
 Sam Homaee – songwriting, synthesizer
 Dante Hemingway - mix engineer, vocal production
 Bart Schoudel – vocal production
 Will Quinnell – assistant mastering engineer, studio personnel
 Chris Gehringer – mastering, studio personnel
 Miles Comaskey – mix engineer, studio personnel
 Tony Maserati – mixing, studio personnel

Charts

Release history

References

2020 singles
2020 songs
Selena Gomez songs
Songs written by Selena Gomez
Songs written by Julia Michaels
Songs written by Justin Tranter
Song recordings produced by the Roommates
Electropop songs